is a railway station within the city limits of Hachinohe, Aomori Prefecture, Japan. Served by trains operating on JR East's Hachinohe Line, it is situated 17.5 kilometers from the northern terminus of the line at Hachinohe Station.

Station layout
Mutsu-Shirahama Station has a single ground-level side platform serving one bi-directional track. There is no station building. The station is unattended.

History
The station was opened on April 15, 1961. With the privatization of the Japan National Railways on April 1, 1987, it came under the operational control of JR East.

Surroundinga area
Sanriku Fukkō National Park

See also
 List of Railway Stations in Japan

External links

JR East station information page 

Railway stations in Aomori Prefecture
Railway stations in Japan opened in 1961
Hachinohe Line
Hachinohe
Stations of East Japan Railway Company